Greg Kiltie (born 18 January 1997) is a Scottish professional footballer who plays as a winger for St Mirren.

Early life
Kiltie was born in Irvine. As a nine-year-old child he was a mascot in the Brazil-Australia group game at the 2006 FIFA World Cup, after winning a competition organised by the Sunday Mail. His father Jim is a BT engineer.

Club career
He signed a professional contract with Kilmarnock at the age of 16. He made his senior debut for Kilmarnock on 18 May 2013, as they lost 3–1 at home to St Mirren in a Scottish Premier League game. His debut came at the age of 16 years and four months, making him Kilmarnock's youngest player for 50 years.

On 3 October 2014, Kiltie signed for Scottish Championship club Queen of the South on a one-month loan.

During the 2016–17 season, Kiltie was out for six months following knee surgery in October, then on 20 May 2017, during Kilmarnock's final match of the season against Ross County he was injured during the first half. It was later announced he had suffered a broken ankle and following an operation, he was not able to play again for seven months.

In January 2019 he moved on loan to Greenock Morton.

Kiltie moved on a season-long loan to Dunfermline Athletic on 2 September 2019, with both clubs having a recall option on the loan in January. Kiltie said that he made the move after Kilmarnock manager Angelo Alessio didn't give him a "fair chance". While on loan at Dunfermline, Kiltie scored the opener in a 3–2 win against his parent club's rivals Ayr United on 19 October 2019. Kiltie returned to his parent club in January 2020. On 1 June 2020 he signed a new one-year contract. He left Kilmarnock in June 2021.

He signed for St Mirren on 6 June 2021, on a two-year contract.

International career
Kiltie has represented Scotland at every youth international level from under-15 to under-19.

Career statistics

References

1997 births
Living people
Scottish footballers
Kilmarnock F.C. players
Queen of the South F.C. players
Scottish Premier League players
Scottish Professional Football League players
Association football wingers
Footballers from Irvine, North Ayrshire
Scotland youth international footballers
Greenock Morton F.C. players
Dunfermline Athletic F.C. players
St Mirren F.C. players